Schœneck is a commune in the Moselle department in Grand Est in north-eastern France. It is located in the Warndt Basin, and is a border town with Germany, wedged between Stiring-Wendel and Saarbrücken.

Coal concession

In 1846 Charles de Wendel and the Parisian businessman Georges Hainguerlot bought the coal mining concession of Schœneck.
Surveys proved positive, and in 1851 Wendel, Hainguerlot, the engineer Kind and the surveyor d'Hausens formed a limited company to exploit the concession, authorized in 1853 as the Compagnie des houillères de Stiring (Stiring Coal Company).
The first two shafts were sunk using an innovative system designed by Kind, but ran into problems with water.
A third shaft, sunk with more conventional techniques, was started in 1854 and entered production in 1856.
Other shafts were sunk, and production grew steadily.

See also
 Communes of the Moselle department

References

Sources

External links
 

Schoeneck